Microcostaphron parvus is an extinct species of wasp belonging to the extinct family Radiophronidae which existed in Spain during the early Cretaceous period. Only a single specimen is known, which was found near Peñacerrada-Urizaharra in the Basque Country.

References

Ceraphronoidea
Cretaceous insects
Hymenoptera of Europe
Fossil taxa described in 2010
Prehistoric insects of Europe